Yuxa (Latin: Yuxa Yilan, Cyrillic: Юха елан, Old Turkic: 𐰖𐰆𐰎𐰀), or Sly Snake, is a legendary creature that figures in Turkic folklore. According to popular beliefs, every 100-year-old snake is transformed into Yuxa. In fairy tales, Yuxa is described as a beautiful damsel who would marry men in order to beget offspring.

Yuxa sometimes spelled Yuha, is a legendary creature with a dragon's head, which may be said to breathe fire or possess a venomous bite, a reptilian body, two legs (sometimes none), and a barbed tail. It can turn into handsome young men and beautiful young women to seduce, protect or terrify the people around them as their whim dictates.

See also
 Chuvash dragon
 Olgoi Khorkhoi – Mongolian Death Worm
 Yelbeghen
 Zilant
 Lilith

References

External links
 Ювха (Yuvha) 
 Mythology and Legendary Beings
 Мифы народов мира - Ювха

Turkic legendary creatures
European legendary creatures
Shapeshifting
Legendary serpents
Female legendary creatures